The  is a constituency that represents Aomori Prefecture in the House of Councillors in the Diet of Japan. Councillors are elected to the house by single non-transferable vote (SNTV) for six-year terms. Since the establishment of the current House of Councillors electoral system in 1947, the district has elected two Councillors, one each at elections held every three years. It has 1,122,948 registered voters as of September 2015.

The Councillors currently representing Aomori are:
 Masayo Tanabu (Democratic Party (DP)); elected for the first time in 2016, and her current term will end in 2022.
 Motome Takisawa (LDP); elected to his first term in 2013, reelected in 2019 and his current term will end in 2025.

Elected Councillors

Election results

See also
Aomori 1st district - one of 4 districts that represents Aomori Prefecture in the House of Representatives

References

Footnotes

Districts of the House of Councillors (Japan)